Wernigerode Castle is a schloss located in the Harz mountains above the town of Wernigerode in Saxony-Anhalt, Germany. The present-day building, finished in the late 19th century, is similar in style to Schloss Neuschwanstein, though its foundations are much older. It is open to the public and one of the most frequently visited in Saxony-Anhalt.

History
The first mention of the Saxon noble Adalbert of Haimar, Count of Wernigerode, in an 1121 deed is also the first documentation of the settlement, which had been founded about a century earlier in connection with the deforestation of the area. The counts built the castle on a slope south of the town as their residence; it was first mentioned as a castrum in 1213. When the line became extinct in 1429, the Wernigerode lands were inherited by the neighbouring County of Stolberg. The castle became the seat of the subordinate Amt administration and was put in pledge several times.

When in 1645 the Stolberg-Stolberg line split, Wernigerode again became the capital of the County of Stolberg-Wernigerode. The counts however struggled with the citizens in the course of the Thirty Years' War and had to take their residence at nearby Ilsenburg House. It was not until 1710 that Count Christian Ernest could relocate the seat of government back to Wernigerode, when he had the castle rebuilt as a schloss in a Baroque style. He ruled for 61 years, though he had to accept the overlordship of King Frederick William I of Prussia in 1714.

Christian Ernest's descendant Count Otto, first president of the Prussian Province of Hanover from 1867, president of the Prussian House of Lords from 1872 and German Vice-Chancellor from 1878, had the schloss again extensively rebuilt in a Neo-Romantic, style known as historicism, finishing the project in 1893. The entire complex includes a chapel built in 1880 according to plans by the renowned Vienna architect Friedrich von Schmidt. In 1945 the building was seized by the Soviet Military Administration in Germany.

References

External links 

 Official Website
 Aerial Map of Wernigerode Castle
 

Castles in Saxony-Anhalt
Museums in Saxony-Anhalt
Castles in the Harz
Wernigerode
Historic house museums in Germany
Buildings and structures in Harz (district)